Bambekea is a genus of flowering plants belonging to the family Cucurbitaceae.

Its native range is Western and Western Central Tropical Africa.

Species:

Bambekea racemosa

References

Cucurbitaceae
Cucurbitaceae genera
Taxa named by Alfred Cogniaux